Clifford Earl (29 August 1933 – 30 July 2015) was an English actor who appeared in numerous television programmes and films.

Early years
Earl was born Kenneth Clifford Earl on 29 August 1933 in Romney Marsh, Kent, England.

He carried out his National Service in a medical role. After leaving the military he embarked on an acting career, often playing policemen and soldiers.

Acting career
Earl appeared in the TV series Doctor Who twice: as the Station Sergeant in The Daleks' Master Plan in 1965, and as Major Branwell in The Invasion in 1968.

He also appeared in the films The Haunted House of Horror (1969), Scream and Scream Again (1970) and The Sea Wolves (1980).

Personal life
In 1953, aged 19, Earl was among the servicemen who volunteered to take part in experiments at the Porton Down military research centre which he believed were related to the common cold but in fact involved exposure to nerve agents such as sarin. Unknown to Earl at the time, in the same sequence of tests another serviceman, Ronald Maddison, died soon after exposure to the poison. Much later, in 1999, police began Operation Antler to investigate the experiments; on learning of this, Earl founded the Porton Down Veterans Support Group.

Earl suffered from spinal problems, prostate cancer, and other illnesses.

Selected filmography
 The Two-Headed Spy (1958) – British Soldier (uncredited)
 The Two Faces of Dr. Jekyll (1960) – Young Blood (uncredited)
 Touch of Death (1961) – Mr. Grey
 Clue of the Silver Key (1961) – Detective
 Man Detained (1961) – Detective Sergeant Wentworth
 Attempt to Kill (1961) – Sergeant Bennett
 The Pot Carriers (1962) – Prison Officer (Kitchen)
 Jigsaw (1962) – 2nd Press Man (uncredited)
 Incident at Midnight (1963) – Sergeant
 A Stitch in Time (1963) – TV Cameraman (uncredited)
 Father Came Too! (1963) – Motorcycle Policeman
 Subterfuge (1968) – Policeman
 The Body Stealers (1969) – Sgt. in Lab
 The Haunted House of Horror (1969) – Police Sergeant Pelley
 Scream and Scream Again (1970) – Detective Sgt. Jimmy Joyce
 Diamonds Are Forever (1971) – Immigration Officer (uncredited)
 Action at Dog Island (1972)
 Tales from the Crypt (1972) – Police Sergeant (segment 3 "Poetic Justice")
 All Coppers Are... (1972) – Police Jailer (uncredited)
 Penny Gold (1973) – CID Man (uncredited)
 The Human Factor (1979) – Ferguson
 The Sea Wolves (1980) – Sloane

References

External links 
 

1933 births
2015 deaths
English male film actors
English male television actors
People from Folkestone and Hythe District
People from Aylesford